Phu Sang National Park is a national park in Northern Thailand.

It covers the Thoeng District of Chiang Rai Province and Chiang Kham and Phu Sang Districts of Phayao Province.

Description
Phu Sang National Park, with an area of 178,049 rai ~  is located in one of the north-easternmost mountain chains of the Phi Pan Nam Range bordering Laos.
The sources of many rivers are in these mountains. The park also has caves with stalactites and stalagmites and a warm water waterfall, Namtok Wang Kaew.

Flora and fauna
Trees in the protected area include Dipterocarpus obtusifolius, Dipterocarpus alatus, Dipterocarpus turbinatus, Lagerstroemia loudonii, Lagerstroemia calyculata, Lagerstroemia tomentosa, Anisoptera costata, Michelia floribunda, Artocarpus lacucha, Pterocarpus macrocarpus, Afzelia xylocarpa,  Xylia xylocarpa, Terminalia bellirica, Tectona grandis, Dillenia pentagyna, Schleichera oleosa, Lithocarpus densiflorus and Irvingia malayana.

Animals in the park area include the Indian muntjac, the Burmese hare, the Indochinese flying squirrel, black giant squirrel, the Java mouse-deer and the jungle cat.

See also
List of national parks of Thailand
List of Protected Areas Regional Offices of Thailand

References

External links
Phu Sang National Park - Thaiforestbooking
Namtok Phu Sang National Park - Tourism Thailand

Geography of Chiang Rai province
Geography of Phayao province
Tourist attractions in Chiang Rai province
Tourist attractions in Phayao province
National parks of Thailand
Protected areas established in 2000
2000 establishments in Thailand
Phi Pan Nam Range